The NZSA Waitangi Day Literary Honours are awarded each year to one or more New Zealand writers. They are an initiative of the New Zealand Society of Authors (Pen NZ Inc) Te Puni Kaituhi o Aotearoa and were first given out in 2014.

History 
The NZSA Waitangi Day Literary Honours are an annual award made by the Board of the New Zealand Society of Authors (Pen NZ Inc) Te Puni Kaituhi o Aotearoa (NZSA) after a call for nominations from NZSA members. They are given to one or more candidates to celebrate and acknowledge literary success, especially on the international stage.

This Award, first given out in 2014, is described by NZSA Past-President Kyle Mewburn as “the only literary award bestowed by peers”. 2016 Recipient Anna Smaill said that “It’s a real honour to be recognised in this way by the NZSA” and Selina Tusitala Marsh said in 2017, “Fa’afetai tele lava for this lovely acknowledgment.” Ashleigh Young said in 2018, “I can’t express how much it means to be given such an acknowledgement.”  

The Awards are announced each year on or around Waitangi Day.

List of winners by year 
2014: Damien Wilkins, Owen Marshall, Ted Dawe, Martin Edmond

2015: Eleanor Catton, Phillip Mann, Anthony McCarten

2016: Anna Smaill, Paul Cleave

2017: Selina Tusitala Marsh

2018: Ashleigh Young

2019: Lani Wendt Young and Liam McIlvanney

2020:  Rachael King and  Lee Murray

2022: Laura Jean McKay

See also 

 List of New Zealand literary awards

External links 

 NZSA Waitangi Day Literary Honours on the New Zealand Society of Authors (NZSA) website, with a list of prize winners.

References 

New Zealand literary awards